The Danish Golf Tour, currently titled as the ECCO Tour for sponsorship reasons, is a developmental professional golf tour based in Denmark. Similar to the Swedish Golf Tour, most events on the Danish Golf Tour schedule are incorporated into the Nordic Golf League, one of the four third-tier tours recognized by the European Tour.

History
The tour was founded in 2002 as a joint venture by Dan Stage and the PGA of Denmark. The aim of the tour being to provide a new generation of golfers with optimal conditions for developing their game.

The tour originally signed a three-year agreement in 2002 with Danish-based shoe manufacturer ECCO who would be the inaugural title sponsor of the tour for the first three seasons. The agreement was ceased in 2006 and Scanplan Ejendomme became the new title sponsor of the tour. This deal lasted until 2007, when ECCO was reinstated as the title sponsor for the 2008 season onwards.

The Order of Merit has commonly been titled as the Race to HimmerLand, with the final event on the schedule in recent seasons being played at the HimmerLand Golf & Spa Resort (also host to the Made in HimmerLand event on the European Tour).

2023 season

Schedule
The following table lists official events during the 2023 season.

2022 season

Schedule
The following table lists official events during the 2022 season.

Order of Merit
The Order of Merit was titled as the Race to HimmerLand and was based on prize money won during the season, calculated using a points-based system.

2021 season

Schedule
The following table lists official events during the 2021 season.

Order of Merit
The Order of Merit was titled as the Race to HimmerLand and was based on prize money won during the season, calculated using a points-based system.

2020 season

Schedule
The following table lists official events during the 2020 season.

Order of Merit
The Order of Merit was titled as the Race to HimmerLand and was based on prize money won during the season, calculated using a points-based system.

2019 season

Schedule
The following table lists official events during the 2019 season.

Order of Merit
The Order of Merit was titled as the Race to HimmerLand and was based on prize money won during the season, calculated using a points-based system.

2018 season

Schedule
The following table lists official events during the 2018 season.

Order of Merit
The Order of Merit was titled as the Race to HimmerLand and was based on prize money won during the season, calculated using a points-based system.

2017 season

Schedule
The following table lists official events during the 2017 season.

Order of Merit
The Order of Merit was titled as the Race to HimmerLand and was based on prize money won during the season, calculated using a points-based system.

2016 season

Schedule
The following table lists official events during the 2016 season.

Order of Merit
The Order of Merit was titled as the Race to HimmerLand and was based on prize money won during the season, calculated in Danish krone.

2015 season

Schedule
The following table lists official events during the 2015 season.

Order of Merit
The Order of Merit was titled as the Race to HimmerLand and was based on prize money won during the season, calculated in Danish krone.

2014 season

Schedule
The following table lists official events during the 2014 season.

Order of Merit
The Order of Merit was titled as the Race to HimmerLand and was based on prize money won during the season, calculated in Danish krone.

2013 season

Schedule
The following table lists official events during the 2013 season.

Order of Merit
The Order of Merit was titled as the Backtee Race to HimmerLand and was based on prize money won during the season, calculated in Danish krone.

2012 season

Schedule
The following table lists official events during the 2012 season.

Order of Merit
The Order of Merit was titled as the Backtee Race to HimmerLand and was based on prize money won during the season, calculated in Danish krone.

2011 season

Schedule
The following table lists official events during the 2011 season.

Order of Merit
The Order of Merit was titled as the Backtee Race to HimmerLand and was based on prize money won during the season, calculated in Danish krone.

2010 season

Schedule
The following table lists official events during the 2010 season.

Order of Merit
The Order of Merit was titled as the Backtee Race to HimmerLand and was based on prize money won during the season, calculated in Danish krone.

2009 season

Schedule
The following table lists official events during the 2009 season.

Order of Merit
The Order of Merit was titled as the Backtee Race to HimmerLand and was based on prize money won during the season, calculated in Danish krone.

2008 season

Schedule
The following table lists official events during the 2008 season.

Order of Merit
The Order of Merit was based on prize money won during the season, calculated in Danish krone.

2007 season

Schedule
The following table lists official events during the 2007 season.

Order of Merit
The Order of Merit was based on prize money won during the season, calculated using a points-based system.

2006 season

Schedule
The following table lists official events during the 2006 season.

Order of Merit
The Order of Merit was based on prize money won during the season, calculated using a points-based system.

2005 season

Schedule
The following table lists official events during the 2005 season.

Order of Merit
The Order of Merit was based on prize money won during the season, calculated using a points-based system.

2004 season

Schedule
The following table lists official events during the 2004 season.

Order of Merit
The Order of Merit was based on prize money won during the season, calculated using a points-based system.

2003 season

Schedule
The following table lists official events during the 2003 season.

Order of Merit
The Order of Merit was based on prize money won during the season, calculated using a points-based system.

Order of Merit winners

See also
Finnish Tour
Nordic Golf League
Norwegian Golf Tour
Swedish Golf Tour

Notes

References

External links

Professional golf tours
Golf in Denmark